Cytora depressa is a species of very small land snails with an operculum, terrestrial gastropod molluscs in the family Pupinidae.

Distribution 
This species occur in New Zealand.

References

Pupinidae
Gastropods of New Zealand